Storge, or familial love, refers to natural or instinctual affection, such as the love of a parent towards offspring and vice versa.

In social psychology, another term for love between good friends is philia.

Extent 
Storge is a wide-ranging force which can apply between family members, friends, pets and their owners, companions or colleagues; it can also blend with and help underpin other types of ties such as passionate love or friendship.

Thus "storge" may function as a general term to characterize the love between exceptional friends, and their desire to care compassionately for one another.

Storge love 
Sometimes the term is used to refer to the love between married partners who are committed and plan to have a long relationship together, particularly as a fundamental relational foundation after initial infatuation (limerence).

Another interpretation for storge is to be used to describe a sexual relationship between two people that gradually grew out of a friendship—storgic lovers sometimes cannot pinpoint the moment that friendship turned to love. Storgic lovers are friends first; the friendship and the storge can endure even beyond the breakup of the sexual relationship. They want their significant others to also be their best friends, and will choose their mates based on similar goals and interests—homogamy. Storgic lovers place much importance on commitment, and find that their motivation to avoid committing infidelity is to preserve the trust between the two partners. Children and marriage are seen as legitimate long-term aims for their bond, while passionate sexual intensity is of lesser importance than in other love styles.

Advantages 
The advantages of storgic love may be how much storgic lovers love their own families and understand each other. In addition, two people who are deeply devoted to one another can feel the intimacy that they share.

See also 
 Agape, Philia, Philautia, Eros: Greek terms for love
Attachment theory
Greek words for love
Immediate family
Love styles
The Four Loves

References

Further reading 
 Lee JA (1973). The colors of love: an exploration of the ways of loving.
 Lee JA (1988). "Love styles" in Barnes MH, Sternberg RJ. The psychology of love.
 Lewis CS (1960). The four loves.
 Wood JT (2015). Interpersonal communication: everyday encounters. 8 ed.

Philosophy of love
Family